In the United Kingdom, a trust port is a port that is administered as a trust by an independent statutory body set up by an Act of Parliament and governed by its own set of rules and statutes. This is in contrast to a private port, which is privately owned, and a municipal port, which is owned by the local authority.

Although there are 52 trust ports in England and Wales the UK government's web page for trust ports has closed. An example of a Scottish trust port is Aberdeen Harbour Board.

Modernising Trust Ports: A Guide to Good Governance notes that:

A number of trust ports have been privatized under the provisions of the Ports Act 1991. The British government is considering further privatizations of trust ports in the future.

List of trust ports 

 Aberdeen Harbour Board
 Berwick Harbour Commissioners  
 Bridlington Pier & Harbour Commissioners
 Brightlingsea Harbour Commissioners 
 Caernarfon Harbour Trustees 
 Cattewater Harbour Commissioners 
 Chichester Harbour Conservancy 
 Cowes Harbour Commissioners 
 Crouch Harbour Authority 
 Dart Harbour & Navigation Authority
 Falmouth Harbour Commissioners 
 Flamborough North Sea Landing Harbour Commissioners
 Fowey Harbour Commissioners 
 Gloucester Harbour Trustees
 Great Yarmouth Port Authority 
Harwich Haven Authority 
 Hope Cove Harbour Commissioners
 King's Lynn Conservancy Board 
 Lancaster Port Commissioners 
 Langstone Harbour Board
 Littlehampton Harbour Board
 Lymington Harbour Commissioners
 Maldon Harbour Improvement Commissioners 
 Maryport Harbour Commissioners 
 Mevagissey Harbour Trustees
Milford Haven Port Authority
 Mousehole Harbour Commissioners
 Neath Harbour Commissioners 
 Newlyn Pier & Harbour Commissioners
 Newport Harbour Commissioners
 North Sunderland Harbour Commissioners
 Orford Town Trustees 
 Padstow Harbour Commissioners  
 Polperro Harbour Trustees
Poole Harbour Commissioners
 Port Isaac Harbour Commissioners
Port of Blyth
Port of Dover
Port of London Authority
Port of Tyne
 Portloe Harbour Commissioners
 River Yealm Harbour Commissioners  
 Sandwich Port & Haven Commissioners 
 Saundersfoot Harbour Commissioners
Shoreham Port Authority
 Sennen Cove Harbour Commissioners
 Staithes Harbour Commissioners
 Teignmouth Harbour Commissioners 
 Warkworth Harbour Commissioners 
 Wells Harbour Commissioners
 Whitehaven Harbour Commissioners 
 Yarmouth (IOW) Harbour Commissioners

References

See also 
 Port authority